Vilkyčiai Circuit or Vilkyčiai Track is a FIA Grade 6 gravel-clay-asphalt motorsport race track located in Lithuania. The circuit hosts Lithuanian and international autocross, motocross and rallycross competitions.

History 

In 1991, Vilkyčiai Motor Sports Club was established. The club has been responsible for organizing the events in the track. The track was renovated in 1998–1999.

Events 
In 2014, the first international rallycross competition took place – a stage of the European Rallycross Challenge.

In 2019, Lithuanian,
Baltic 
and Polish 
rallycross championship rounds took place on July 26–27. On June 8–9, round 3 of the FIA European Autocross Championship took place.

In 2022 the 2nd round of the FIA European Autocross Championship as well as FIA European Cross Car Championship will take place on 11-12 June.

References

External links 
 Vilkyčiai Motor Sports Club Website
 ASK Vilkyčiai Facebook Page

Motorsport venues in Lithuania